Harvestehuder Tennis und Hockey-Club e. V., also known as Harvestehuder THC or simply Harvestehude, is a German sports club based in Harvestehude, Hamburg. It is best known for its field hockey department but it also has tennis and lacrosse sections.

The club was founded in 1919 by the merger of the tennis club, founded in 1891, and the hockey club, founded in 1904.

Honours

Men
Bundesliga
 Winners (4): 1995–96, 1997–98, 1999–2000, 2013–14
 Runners-up (4): 1962–93, 1992–93, 1993–94, 1998–99
DHB-Pokal
 Winners (1): 1997
Euro Hockey League
 Winners (1): 2013–14
EuroHockey Club Champions Cup
 Runners-up (1): 1997
EuroHockey Cup Winners Cup
 Winners (1): 1995
Indoor Bundesliga
 Winners (5): 1993–94, 1995–96, 2012–13, 2014–15, 2022–23
 Runners-up (4): 1994–95, 1996–97, 2004–05, 2009–10
EuroHockey Indoor Club Cup
 Winners (4): 1997, 1998, 2014, 2016
 Runners-up (1): 1995

Women
Bundesliga
 Winners (14): 1941–42, 1942–43, 1943–44, 1949–50, 1950–51, 1956–57, 1957–58, 1958–59, 1959–60, 1961–62, 1963–64, 1967–68, 1970–71, 1972–73
 Runners-up (4): 1951–52, 1952–53, 1965–66, 1969–70
EuroHockey Club Champions Cup
 Winners (1): 1974
Indoor Bundesliga
 Winners (1): 2006–07
 Runners-up (1): 2016–17
EuroHockey Indoor Club Cup
 Winners (1): 2008

Current squad

Men's squad

Women's squad

References

External links
Official website

 
Field hockey clubs in Germany
Sport in Hamburg
Field hockey clubs established in 1904
Sports clubs established in 1919
1919 establishments in Germany
Multi-sport clubs in Germany